John Theodore Tussaud (2 May 1858 – 13 October 1943) was a British sculptor, manager and chief artist of Madame Tussauds wax museum, as well as an author of several books.

John Theodore Tussaud was born in Kensington, England, the great-grandson of Marie Tussaud. Although his father sold Madame Tussauds to a company headed by Edwin Josiah Poyser in February 1889, John Theodore Tussaud continued in his role as manager and chief artist for many years. He exhibited a bust of Alfred, Lord Tennyson and other sculptures at the Royal Academy. He wrote a book on the history of Madame Tussauds and the book The Chosen Four about four of Napoleon Bonaparte's loyal supporters who followed him into exile on Saint Helena. In 1935, Tussaud was elected a fellow of the Royal Society of Arts. He died in Croxley Green in 1943.

References

1858 births
1943 deaths
19th-century British sculptors
20th-century British sculptors
English sculptors
English male sculptors
People from Kensington
English people of French descent
English people of German descent